BlazeVOX Books, often stylized as BlazeVOX [books], is an independent publisher founded by Geoffrey Gatza and based in Buffalo, New York. Since 2000, it has published more than 350 books of poetry and prose, most of which fall within the sphere of avant-garde literature.

BlazeVOX Books also publishes BlazeVOX, a biannual journal of poetry and prose founded in 1999. Authors published in BlazeVOX include Louis Armand, William James Austin, George Bowering, Mitch Corber, Robert Creeley, Lily Hoang, Lisa Jarnot, Hank Lazer, David Meltzer, Eileen Myles, Ricardo Nazario y Colón, Simon Perchik, Linda Ravenswood, Steve Roggenbuck, Keith Waldrop, Rosmarie Waldrop, Lewis Warsh, and Steven Zultanski.

Mission
According to the mission statement published by the press, BlazeVOX aims to "disseminate poetry, through print and digital media, both within academic spheres and to society at large," and, more broadly, to "push at the frontiers of what is possible." Its specific commitment, with respect to its sizable contemporary poetry list, is to "publish the innovative works of the greatest minds writing poetry today, from the most respected senior poets to extraordinarily promising young writers." BlazeVOX has also committed itself to publish works "regardless of commercial viability."

History
Both BlazeVOX Books and BlazeVox were founded at Daemen College in Amherst, New York, where in 1999 Gatza began publishing an undergraduate literary magazine exclusively online. The first issue of BlazeVOX appeared in the Fall of 2000, featuring work by Lisa Jarnot and Alan Sondheim, while the press's first four full-length collections—by William Allegrezza, Raymond L. Bianchi, Patrick Herron, and Theodore Pelton—were published in 2004. By the end of 2005, BlazeVOX had already published full-length collections by Sondheim, Kazim Ali, Michael Kelleher, and Amy King, whose Antidotes for an Alibi would be a finalist for the 2006 Lambda Literary Award. BlazeVOX began publishing approximately five books of fiction annually in 2006, and one book of nonfiction literary criticism per year starting in 2010.

Since 2002, BlazeVOX has featured online recordings of its authors on its website, a practice that in recent years has manifested in a semi-regular podcast. Poets and writers featured in these recordings and podcasts include Robert Creeley, Forrest Gander, and Michael Kelleher. Since 2010, BlazeVOX has also offered a small selection of free eBooks on its website, as well as Kindle editions of many of its titles.

Every edition of BlazeVOX since 2006 has featured an extended selection of poems from one author native to Buffalo, New York, where the headquarters of the press is located. Authors selected for this feature, entitled Buffalo Focus (stylized as "buffaloFOCUS"), include Nava Fader, Kevin Thurston, and Clarice Waldman.

In 2016, BlazeVOX author Daniel Borzutzky won the National Book Award for The Performance of Becoming Human, published by Brooklyn Arts Press.

Reception
Artvoice notes that "many books by BlazeVox have received national acclaim," while Coal Hill Review has observed that "BlazeVOX poetry collections tend to have three things in common: physically, they tend to be oversized and very attractive; stylistically, they tend to be experimental; and quality-wise, they tend to be strong." Drunken Boat, an international journal of literature and the arts, credits BlazeVOX Books with offering its readers "an eclectic mix of today's experimental voices."

Among other honors, books published by BlazeVOX have been short-listed for the Lambda Literary Award, anthologized in large-scale university-press compilations such as Against Expression: An Anthology of Conceptual Writing (Northwestern University Press, 2011), and reviewed in major venues such as Jacket2 and the website of the Best American Poetry series.

Authors

Poets and writers with poetry or prose collections on BlazeVOX Books include:

Seth Abramson
Kazim Ali
William Allegrezza
Joe Amato
Aaron Apps
Michael Basinski
Martine Bellen
Aaron Belz
Bill Berkson
Daniel Borzutzky
Tom Bradley
Ron Burch
Patrick Chapman
Cris Cheek
Tom Clark
Jesse Damiani
Alberto de Lacerda
Jennifer K. Dick
Robert Duncan
Rachel Blau DuPlessis
Kari Edwards
Clayton Eshleman
Andrew Farkas
Michael Farrell
Raymond Federman
Jeanpaul Ferro
Gloria Frym
John Gallaher
Robert Gibbons
Jesse Glass
Noah Eli Gordon
Matt Hart
Bobbie Louise Hawkins
Barbara Henning
Bruce Jackson
Kent Johnson
Jane Joritz-Nakagawa
Andrew Joron
Michael Joyce
Vincent Katz
Michael Kelleher
Kevin Killian
Burt Kimmelman
Amy King
Linda King
John Kinsella
Rodney Koeneke
Krystal Languell
Evan Lavender-Smith
David Dodd Lee
Masiela Lusha
Michael Magee
John Matthias
Cris Mazza
Gillian McCain
Deborah Meadows
Corey Mesler
Peter Money
Simone Muench
Sheila Murphy
Daniel Nester
Urayoán Noel
Cheryl Pallant
Ted Pearson
Michelle Naka Pierce
Stephen Ratcliffe
Elizabeth Robinson
Kit Robinson
Tomaž Šalamun
George Schneeman
Davis Schneiderman
Steven D. Schroeder
Larissa Shmailo
Dale Smith
Alan Sondheim
Jordan Stempleman
Chad Sweeney
Eileen Tabios
Anne Tardos
John Tranter
David Trinidad
Lawrence Upton
Anne Waldman

References

External links
 BlazeVOX Books

Book publishing companies based in New York (state)
Culture of Buffalo, New York
Small press publishing companies
Publishing companies established in 2000
Companies based in Buffalo, New York